Bolshoye Zhirovo is a rural locality and the administrative center of Bolshezhirovsky Selsoviet Rural Settlement, Fatezhsky District, Kursk Oblast, Russia. Population:

Geography 
The village is located 100 km from the Russia–Ukraine border, 29 km north-west of Kursk, 15 km south-east of the district center – the town Fatezh.

 Climate
Bolshoye Zhirovo has a warm-summer humid continental climate (Dfb in the Köppen climate classification).

Transport 
Bolshoye Zhirovo is located on the federal route  Crimea Highway as part of the European route E105, 17 km from the road of regional importance  (Fatezh – Dmitriyev), on the road of intermunicipal significance  (Bolshoye Zhirovo – Skripeyevka – Kutasovka), 25 km from the nearest railway halt 521 km (railway line Oryol – Kursk).

The rural locality is situated 31.5 km from Kursk Vostochny Airport, 151 km from Belgorod International Airport and 225 km from Voronezh Peter the Great Airport.

References

Notes

Sources

Rural localities in Fatezhsky District
Fatezhsky Uyezd